"Rock Forever" is a song by British heavy metal band Judas Priest, originally released on their 1978 album Killing Machine, and released as the B Side of Before the Dawn  the same year (CBS 6794 (UK)).

The song contains a guitar duet by guitarists K. K. Downing and Glenn Tipton.

1979 bonus single release

A bonus (live) single was released in 1979 with the Japanese release of the LP Unleashed in the East. (CBS S JP 1)

The tracks were also included in the 2001 CD re-release of Unleashed in the East

1979 track listing
Side A
Rock Forever (3:25)
Hell Bent For Leather (2:39)
Side B
Beyond the Realms of Death (7:20)

1981 12 inch Maxi single
With the catalogue number CBS A-12.1864, this single was released in the Netherlands in 1981.

Personnel
 Rob Halford – vocals
 K. K. Downing – guitar
 Glenn Tipton – guitar
 Ian Hill – bass guitar
 Les Binks – drums

References

1978 songs
1979 singles
Judas Priest songs
Songs written by Glenn Tipton
Songs written by K. K. Downing
Songs written by Rob Halford